Lars-Magnus Lindgren (3 July 1922 – 23 November 2004) was a Swedish film director and screenwriter. His film Dear John (1964) was nominated for the Academy Award for Best Foreign Language Film. His other works include  (Svarta palmkronor), a 1968 film, based on the 1944 novel by Peder Sjögren.

Selected filmography
 A Dreamer's Journey (1957)
 Hide and Seek (1963)

References

External links

1922 births
2004 deaths
Swedish film directors
Swedish male screenwriters
People from Västerås
20th-century Swedish screenwriters
20th-century Swedish male writers